The 2011–12 Vijay Hazare Trophy was the tenth season of the Vijay Hazare Trophy, a List A cricket tournament in India. It was contested between 27 domestic cricket teams of India, starting in February and finishing in March 2012. In the final, Bengal beat Mumbai by 6 wickets to win their maiden title.

Group Matches
Central Zone

  Railways and Madhya Pradesh qualified for the knockout stage.

East Zone

  Bengal and Assam qualified for the knockout stage.

North Zone

  Delhi and Punjab qualified for the knockout stage.

South Zone

  Karnataka and Hyderabad qualified for the knockout stage.

West Zone

  Mumbai and Maharashtra qualified for the knockout stage.

Knockout Matches
Preliminary Quarterfinal 1

Preliminary Quarterfinal 2

Quarterfinal 1

Quarterfinal 2

Quarterfinal 3

Quarterfinal 4

Semifinal 1

Semifinal 2

Final

References

External links
 Series home at ESPN Cricinfo

Vijay Hazare Trophy
Vijay Hazare Trophy